Peru is an unincorporated community on the South Fork South Branch Potomac River in Hardy County, West Virginia, United States.

References 

Unincorporated communities in Hardy County, West Virginia
Unincorporated communities in West Virginia